Trachinus is a genus of weevers, order Perciformes that consists of seven extant species. Six of the genus representatives inhabit the waters of Eastern Atlantic Ocean, but only one, Trachinus cornutus, inhabits the South-Eastern Pacific Ocean. Three of the Atlantic species occur near the coasts of Europe.  An eighth extinct species, T. minutus, is known from Oligocene-aged strata from the Carpathian Mountains, while a ninth species, also extinct, T. dracunculus, is known from middle-Miocene-aged strata from Piemonte, Italy.

Species
Spotted weever, Trachinus araneus Cuvier, 1829.
Guinean weever, Trachinus armatus Bleeker, 1861.
Sailfin weever, Trachinus collignoni Roux, 1957.
Trachinus cornutus Guichenot, 1848.
Greater weever, Trachinus draco Linnaeus, 1758.
Striped weever, Trachinus lineolatus Fischer, 1885.
Cape Verde weever, Trachinus pellegrini Cadenat, 1937.
Starry weever, Trachinus radiatus Cuvier, 1829.
†Oligocene Carpathian weever, Trachinus minutus (Jonet, 1958)
†Miocene weever, Trachinus draculanus Heckel, 1849

References

Sources
 Trachinus at FishBase

External links
 

 
Trachinidae
Extant Oligocene first appearances
Marine fish genera
Taxa named by Carl Linnaeus